The Illinois River Bridge is a historic bridge, carrying a discontinued portion of Kincheloe Road (once designated Benton County Road 196) over the Illinois River northeast of the hamlet of Pedro, Arkansas. The bridge was built by the county in 1922, and was closed to traffic in 2004.

The bridge was listed on the National Register of Historic Places in 2005, and it is one of three Illinois River bridge crossings in Arkansas named "Illinois River Bridge" that are NRHP-listed.

See also
Illinois River Bridge (Siloam Springs), in or near Siloam Springs, Arkansas
Illinois River Bridge at Phillips Ford, in or near Savoy, Arkansas
National Register of Historic Places listings in Benton County, Arkansas
List of bridges on the National Register of Historic Places in Arkansas

References

Road bridges on the National Register of Historic Places in Arkansas
Bridges completed in 1922
Transportation in Benton County, Arkansas
National Register of Historic Places in Benton County, Arkansas
Pratt truss bridges in the United States
1922 establishments in Arkansas
Illinois River (Oklahoma)